Lanzhou University is a major research university in Lanzhou, Gansu, China. 

Founded in 1909, it is one of the key universities under China's Ministry of Education (Double First Class University Plan, former Project 985 and Project 211). It is a Chinese state Class A Double First Class University identified by the Ministry of Education of China.

It provides programs for undergraduate, graduate students on four campuses—three in Lanzhou city centre and one in Yuzhong County, about 30 miles away from the main campus. Total enrolment compromises of approximately 20,000 undergraduates, 10,572 graduates, 2,559 doctoral students, and about 700 registered international students from 64 countries and regions across 5 continents. Undergraduate students study at the Yuzhong campus. There are 6 National Bases for the Training of Researching and Teaching personnel for Fundamental Disciplines. The University operates an additional 35 institutes along with 1 national key Laboratory of the Applied Organic and 3 key laboratories of Arid and Grassland Ecology, West China Environment, Magnetism and Magnetic Materials of the Ministry of Education, a key laboratory of Grassland Agro-ecosystem of the Ministry of Agriculture. Lanzhou University was one of the first universities entitled to enroll Bachelor Master’s and Doctoral degree candidates in 1981. Lanzhou University is one of the top ten universities in contributions to academic publications in international journals frequently cited by ongoing research from around the world, ranking the 26th among all Chinese Universities in number of citations per paper.

History
Lanzhou University's history traces back to 1909 when its predecessor, the Gansu School of Law and Politics, was founded. The School of Law and Politics became the Sun Yat-sen University of Lanzhou in 1928 and from 1945, the National Lanzhou University. After 1949, it went by the name Lanzhou University. It was designated one of China's 14 key universities.

In 1932 the  Lanzhou Medical College and its affiliated hospital were founded.

In 2002 the Gansu Grassland Ecology Research Institute, and in 2004 the Lanzhou Medical College were incorporated into Lanzhou University.

Lanzhou University is noted for being one of China's premier institutions of higher learning with its position as the best university in Northwestern China.

In 2017, Lanzhou University was designated as a class A university in the Double First Class University Plan.

Lanzhou University maintains one of China's top ten Ph.D. programs in physics, chemistry, atmospheric sciences and geography and highly ranked programs in information science, biology, botany, mathematics, history, media, ecology and Chinese literature. It is especially noted in fundamental science, ranked in the top 1% of the Essential Science Indicators index.

The landing system of China's Chang'e 4 lunar lander was thanks to a Lanzhou University developed gamma shutdown sensor.

Primary laboratories

Lanzhou University has three primary laboratories and analytical testing facility sanctioned by the Chinese Ministry of Education and deemed as high importance to the state.

Laboratory of Arid Agroecology
The laboratory was founded in 1991 under ratification of the Planning Commission of China and engaged in arid agriculture ecology research. The Laboratory of Arid Agroecology is the only lab engaged in arid agriculture ecology research under the Chinese Ministry of Education. The lab has been highly developed on the basis of the authorization to confer bachelor, masters, doctorate and post-doctoral degrees through the financial aid of the World Bank loan.

Laboratory of Applied Organic Chemistry
The Laboratory of Applied Organic Chemistry was one of the first state key laboratories ratified by Planning Commission of China. It was founded in December 1987, open to visiting scholars and scientists from both within China and abroad. It is one primary laboratories to cultivate talents for organic chemistry. The researches of the laboratory focus on organic molecular chemistry of special function, especially in the field of basic research on active organic molecules.

Open Laboratory of Applied Magnetism
Created in 1993 by the Chinese Ministry of Education, this is an open laboratory conducting research in the field of Applied Magnetism. The lab is chiefly engaged in studies on applications of perpendicular magnetic recording. The laboratory also conducts research and development on new applied magnetic materials which can be used for commercial applications. Mossbauer spectrometry, nuclear magnetic resource spin echo spectroscopy and general magnetic testing media are used to study magnetic materials' microscopic structure and general magnetic behavior. The laboratory is equipped with major facilities including a vibrating sample magnetometer, high pressure mossbauer spectroscope and magnetron sputtering system, along with many others. The lab also serves as a key resource for research in materials science and condensed matter physics.

The laboratory has 24 professional researchers and technicians, among who are 4 doctoral advisers.

Analytical Testing Center
Financed by the first loan issued by the World Bank to develop universities, construction on this center began in 1982. It contains more than 20 major instruments and devices including a High-Resolution Mass Spectrometer, Infrared Spectrometer, X-Ray Quadrupole Diffractometer, Laser Raman Spectrometer, FT-IR Spectrometer, and others. The center is primarily engaged in the determination and analysis of the structure of matter. It also conducts graduate students' experiments which leads to the conferring of Master's and Ph.D. degrees. A testing service is available to the public.

Established by the State Technology Superintendency in 1992, it is the approved lab for the inspection of imported and exported chemical and mining products.

Campus 
Lanzhou University has two campuses. The oldest campus is located in the center of Lanzhou (Chengguan District), whereas the main campus is located in Yuzhong County. The One Belt and One Road campus, north of Lanzhou is under construction.

Rankings and reputation 

In 2021, the Academic Ranking of World Universities (ARWU) ranked Lanzhou University at 301-400th globally. From the same rankings by subjects, "Chemistry" and "Atmospheric Science" subjects were ranked in the global top 100.

The U.S. News & World Report Best Global University Ranking 2021 ranked Lanzhou as 595th in the world, 114th in Asia and 48th in China. It also ranks globally at 188th in "Agricultural Science", at 123rd in "Chemical Engineering", at 150th in "Chemistry", at 157th in "Energy and Fuels", at 403rd in "Engineering", at 304th in "Environment/Ecology", at 167th in "Geoscience", at 150th in "Material Science", 164th in "Mathematics", at 131st in "Nanoscience and Nanotechnology", at 404th in "Physics", and at 244th in "Plant and Animal Science" according to the same ranking.

In 2020, the QS World University Ranking ranked the university within the 751-800th band globally. The Academic Ranking of World Universities (ARWU) ranked Lanzhou University at 401-500th globally.

Schools and Colleges of Lanzhou University

School of Earth Sciences 
School of Network Education
Sports Teaching and Research Department
School of Arts
School of Management
Second Clinical School
First Clinical School
School of Pharmacy
School of Basic Medical Sciences
School of Pastoral Agriculture Science and Technology
School of Earth and Environmental Sciences
School of Atmospheric Sciences
School of Life Sciences
College of Ecology
School of Nuclear Science and Technology
School of Physical Science and Technology
School of Philosophy and Sociology
School of Foreign Languages and Literature
School of International Cultural Exchange
School of Law
School of Economics
School of Marxism
School of History and Culture
School of Journalism and Communication
Ethnology Institute
School of Chinese Language and Literature
School of Mathematics and Statistics
School of Chemistry and Chemical Engineering
Research School of Arid Environment and Climate Change
School of Information Science and Engineering
School of Civil Engineering and Mechanics
School of Public Health
School of Dental Medicine
School of Continuing Education
Cuiying Honors College

Notable faculty and alumni

Zhou Qilin - Professor, Director of the State Key Laboratory of Elemento-organic Chemistry, Nankai University. Academician of Chinese Academy of Science, B.S. of LZU
Zheng Xiaojing - Professor of School of Civil Engineering and Mechanics, Chair of Graduate School, Lanzhou University, Academician of Chinese Academy of Science, Ph.D. of LZU
Tu Yongqiang - Professor of College of Chemistry and Chemical Engineering, Lanzhou University, Academian of Chinese Academy of Science, Ph.D., M.S., B.S. of LZU
Niu Yaoling - Professor of Earth Sciences, Durham University, UK, Graduated from LZU Geology in 1981 
Hu Qing - Professor of Electrical Engineering, MIT, Graduated from LZU Physics
Qin Dahe - Chairman of China Meteorology Administration, Academian of Chinese Academy of Science, Graduated from LZU geography
Liu Renhuai - President of Jinan University, Academian of Chinese Academy of Science, Graduated from LZU mechanics
Shui Junyi - top 10 Distinguished young people, Celebrated TV program host, Graduated from LZU foreign language
Li Yang - founder of Crazy English, Graduated from LZU mechanics
Lu Hao - Governor of Gansu Province, Graduated from LZU Chemistry
Yang Liming - Vice Secretary of Inner Mongolia, Graduated from LZU Philosophy
Zhang Xuezhong - Vice Secretary of Sichuan Province, Graduated from LZU Chinese Language
Liu Hongxiu - Vice Governor of Guizhou Province, Graduated from LZU Chinese Language
Shen Yu - President of Beijing University of Industry and Business, Graduated from LZU Mathematics
Dong Wenjie - Director of The National Meteorology Center, Graduated from LZU Atmosphere
Sun Zhaolin - President of Liaoning Petrochemical University, LZU Chemistry
Lin Xiping - President of Jiangsu Institute of Technology, LZU Chemistry
Cang Hui - Theoretical ecologist, Stellenbosch University, SARChI Chair in Mathematical and Theoretical Physical Biosciences
Huang Bo - CEO at CHINAEDU CORP, a NASDAQ listed company, Class of 1985, Biology, LZU
Chen Miao, Science Leader in surface modification at the molecular scale, The Commonwealth Scientific and Industrial Research Organisation of Australia, Ph.D at LZU Chemistry
Luke Huang, President at Radlink, Inc., www.radlink.com, Dept. of Physics, LZU
Ma Jiong, Principal at Braemar Energy Ventures, a venture capital firm devoted to financing companies developing new technologies for conventional and alternative energy markets, Dept. of Physics, LZU
Myles J. Gao, COO at Silvercorp Metals, Dept. of Geology, Class of 1978, LZU
Dr. George Yang, Chief Economist at the ZGC Shiner Investment and Management Co. Ltd, Class of 1983, Dept. of Mathematics, LZU
Dr. Jerome Z. Liang, VP at Viatronix, Inc., www.viatronix.com, Class of 1978, Dept. of Physics, LZU
Yi Gang Shen, CTO at China Information Security Technology, Incorporated, a NASDAQ listed company, Dept. of Electronics and Information Science, LZU
He Guosen, Senior Investment Manager, Shenzhen Capital Group Co., Ltd, China, Dept. of Chemistry, LZU
Wang Yong, Executive Director, Beijing Development (Hong Kong) Ltd., Dept. of Chinese Studies, LZU
Xin Weirong (William Xin), founder, managing partner at Golden Leaf Investment Group, Inc. Class of 1985, Dept. of Modern Physics, LZU
Wu Yundong, theoretical organic chemist
Shu Hongbing, biologist, academician of Chinese Academy of Science, B.S. of LZU
Ren Jianxin, entrepreneur , founding president of ChemChina, M.S. of LZU
Zhang Dongju, PhD 2010, faculty
Zhang ChunYuan student, rightist, founder of the Lanzhou University Rightist Counter-Revolutionary Clique

References

External links
 Official Lanzhou University Website 
 Official Lanzhou University Website 

 
Universities and colleges in Gansu
Educational institutions established in 1909
Medical schools in China
Universities in China with English-medium medical schools
1909 establishments in China
Vice-ministerial universities in China